It's Not Big It's Large is an album by Lyle Lovett and his Large Band, released in 2007 (see 2007 in music).  The recording was made live in studio (recorded with all instruments as if a concert venue, but done in a studio).

The title is a play on the name Lovett has given to his touring band since 1988.  Lovett explains the title in an interview: "We've always done arrangements that border on blues music, that border on jazz arrangements, that border on what folks might think of as 'big band', but we don't really play big band music.  But we've always had a lot of people in the band so that's why I call the band the 'Large Band' and not the 'Big Band'.  But invariably people refer to the band as the 'Big Band' and ... it's not big... you get the idea."

The album debuted at number 18 on the U.S. Billboard 200 chart, selling about 25,000 copies in its first week.

Track listing 
 "Tickle Toe"
 "I Will Rise Up/Ain't No More Cane" 
 "All Downhill from Here" 
 "Don't Cry a Tear"
 "South Texas Girl"
 "This Traveling Around" 
 "Up in Indiana"
 "The Alley Song" 
 "No Big Deal"
 "Make It Happy"
 "Ain't No More Cane" 
 "Up in Indiana" (acoustic)

Personnel
"Tickle Toe" 
Viktor Krauss: bass
Russ Kunkel: drums
Matt Rollings: piano
Dean Parks: electric guitar, first guitar solo
Mitch Watkins, electric guitar, second guitar solo
Paul Franklin: steel guitar
Stuart Duncan: fiddle, fiddle solo
Gene Elders: fiddle
John Hagen: cello
James Gilmer: percussion
Dan Higggins: orchestration, alto sax, tenor sax
Gary Grant: trumpet
Warren Luening: trumpet, trumpet solo
William Reichenbach: trombone, bass trumpet solo
Steve Marsh: horn arrangement
"I Will Rise Up]/Ain't No More Cane"
Viktor Krauss: additional horn arrangement, bass
Russ Kunkel: drums
Matt Rollings: piano
Dean Parks and Mitch Watkins: electric guitar
Paul Franklin: steel guitar
Lyle Lovett: acoustic guitar, vocals
Sam Bush: mandolin
Gene Elders: fiddle
John Hagen: cello
James Gilmer: percussion
Dan Higggins: orchestration, alto sax, tenor sax
Gary Grant, Steve Herman and Jerry Hey: trumpet
Andy Martin: trombone
Charlie Rose: horn arrangement, trombone
Harvey Thompson and Steve Marsh: tenor sax
Arnold McCuller, Jason Eskridge, Sweet Pea Atkinson, Harry Bowens and Francine Reed: harmony vocals
"All Downhill" 
Viktor Krauss: bass
Russ Kunkel: drums
Matt Rollings: piano
Ray Herndon and Mitch Watkins: electric guitar
Dean Parks: electric baritone guitar
Paul Franklin: steel guitar
Lyle Lovett: acoustic guitar, vocals
Sam Bush: mandolin
Stuart Duncan: fiddle
"Don't Cry A Tear" 
Viktor Krauss: bass
Russ Kunkel: drums
Matt Rollings: piano
Dean Parks: electric guitar
Paul Franklin: steel guitar
Lyle Lovett: acoustic guitar, vocals
Stuart Duncan: fiddle
John Hagen: cello
"South Texas Girl"  
Viktor Krauss: bass
Russ Kunkel: drums
Matt Rollings: piano
Dean Parks: electric guitar
Paul Franklin: steel guitar
Lyle Lovett: acoustic guitar, vocals
Stuart Duncan: fiddle
Sam Bush: mandolin
John Hagen: cello
Jon Randall: harmony vocals
Guy Clark: intro and outro acoustic guitar, intro vocals
James Gilmer, Steve Jones, Jeff White and Billy Williams: outro group vocals
"This Traveling Around" 
Viktor Krauss: bass
Russ Kunkel: drums
Matt Rollings: piano
Dean Parks and Mitch Matkins: electric guitar
Paul Franklin: steel guitar
Lyle Lovett: acoustic guitar, vocals
Stuart Duncan: fiddle
Sam Bush: mandolin
John Hagen: cello
James Gilmer: percussion
Jon Randal: harmony vocals
"Up In Indiana" 
Viktor Krauss: bass
Russ Kunkel: drums
Matt Rollings: piano
Dean Parks: electric guitar
Paul Franklin: steel guitar
Lyle Lovett: acoustic guitar, vocals
Stuart Duncan: fiddle
Sam Bush: mandolin
Jon Randal: harmony vocals
Jeff White: pre-production mandolin and harmony vocals
"The Alley Song" 
Viktor Krauss: bass
Russ Kunkel: drums
Matt Rollings: piano
Dean Parks: electric guitar
Paul Franklin: steel guitar
Lyle Lovett: acoustic guitar, vocals
Stuart Duncan: fiddle
John Hagen: cello
"No Big Deal" 
Viktor Krauss: bass
Russ Kunkel: drums
Matt Rollings: piano
Dean Parks: electric guitar
Paul Franklin: steel guitar
Lyle Lovett: acoustic guitar, vocals
Stuart Duncan: fiddle
"Make It Happy" 
Viktor Krauss: bass
Russ Kunkel: drums
Matt Rollings: piano
Dean Parks: electric guitar
Paul Franklin: steel guitar
Lyle Lovett: acoustic guitar, vocals
Stuart Duncan: fiddle
Sam Bush: mandolin
Arnold McCuller, Sweet Pea Atkinson, Lamont Van Hook and Joseph Powell: harmony vocals
"Ain't No More Cane"  
Viktor Krauss: bass
Matt Rollings: piano
Lyle Lovett: acoustic guitar, vocals
Stuart Duncan: fiddle
Sam Bush: mandolin
Jerry Douglas: dobro
Arnold McCuller, Jason Eskridge, Sweet Pea Atkinson, Harry Bowens, Francine Reed, Lamont Van Hook and Josef Powell: harmony vocals
"Up In Indiana" (acoustic)
Viktor Krauss: bass
Lyle Lovett: acoustic guitar, vocals
Stuart Duncan: fiddle
Sam Bush: mandolin
Jerry Douglas: dobro
Béla Fleck: banjo
Jeff White: pre-production mandolin and harmony vocals

Chart performance

References

Further reading
 "Lyle Lovett Argues Semantics with New Album" by Rebecca Bowen, Paste online, August 1, 2007

2007 albums
Lyle Lovett albums
Lost Highway Records albums